"King Tut" is a novelty song performed by Steve Martin and the Toot Uncommons (actually members of the Nitty Gritty Dirt Band), about the Egyptian pharaoh Tutankhamun and the Treasures of Tutankhamun traveling exhibit that toured seven American cities from 1976 to 1979. It was first performed on Saturday Night Live.

History and description
"King Tut" pays homage to Egyptian pharaoh Tutankhamun and presents a caricature of the Treasures of Tutankhamun traveling exhibit that toured seven American cities from 1976 to 1979. The exhibit attracted approximately eight million visitors.

The song was released as a single in 1978, sold over a million copies, and reached number 17 on the Billboard Hot 100 chart. The song was also included on Martin's album A Wild and Crazy Guy.

Martin previewed the song in a live performance during the April 22, 1978, episode of Saturday Night Live.  In this performance, loyal subjects appease a joyful King Tut with kitchen appliances.  An instrumental solo is delivered by saxophone player Lou Marini, who steps out of a sarcophagus—painted gold—to great laughter.

Record World said of the single that "this rocking novelty could bring Martin a single hit to go with his album sales. Archaeology and top 40 may never be the same again."

In the book Saturday Night: A Backstage History of Saturday Night Live, authors Doug Hill and Jeff Weingrad write that the sketch was one of the most expensive productions the show had attempted up to that point.  Martin had brought the song to the show and asked if he could perform it, not expecting the production that occurred—producer Lorne Michaels put everything behind it.

The song is the subject of an analysis in Melani McAlister's 2001 book, Epic Encounters: Culture, Media, and U.S. Interests in the Middle East Since 1945. It is also referenced in a dialogue in the video game The Lost Vikings (1992) at the end of one of the Egyptian themed levels of the game.

Chicago radio superstation WLS-AM, which gave the song much airplay, ranked "King Tut" as the 11th biggest hit of 1978.  It spent four weeks at the number-one position on their chart. This was not during the time the Tut exhibition was on display at the Field Museum of Natural History near downtown Chicago, which was April 15 – August 15, 1977.

Martin has performed "King Tut" live in a bluegrass arrangement with the band Steep Canyon Rangers on several occasions. One of these performances was released on the 2011 album Rare Bird Alert.

In 2017, students in a humanities class at Reed College in Portland, Oregon, protested the inclusion of the Saturday Night Live performance in their coursework, calling it an example of cultural appropriation while demanding its removal. One complained that the gold face of the saxophone player was a racist exhibition of blackface.

Chart performance

Weekly charts

Year-end charts

References

External links 
  (official channel of Steve Martin)

1978 singles
Steve Martin songs
Novelty songs
Songs about Egypt
Songs about kings
Cultural depictions of Tutankhamun
1978 songs
Warner Records singles
Race-related controversies in music